The 1927–28 United States collegiate men's ice hockey season was the 34th season of collegiate ice hockey in the United States.

Regular season

Standings

References

1927–28 NCAA Standings

External links
College Hockey Historical Archives

1927–28 United States collegiate men's ice hockey season
College